The following is a list of governors of Aleppo Governorate, the most populous governorate of Syria, since 1971.

List of officeholders (1971–present)

See also
Aleppo
History of Aleppo
Timeline of Aleppo
List of governors of Damascus
List of governors of Homs

References

External links
List of Governors of Aleppo; (in Arabic)

Aleppo
History of Aleppo
Rulers of Aleppo
Syria politics-related lists